Bactris nancibaensis is a species of flowering plant in the family Arecaceae. It is found only in French Guiana. It is threatened by habitat loss.

Only two specimens are known: occurring south of the Cayenne area. One has been transplanted to formerly ORSTOM, now IRD (or Institut de recherche pour le développement) Botanical Garden, where it has been observed to flower. The other specimen is located close to a road.

References

nancibaensis
Palms of French Guiana
Critically endangered plants
Taxonomy articles created by Polbot
Taxobox binomials not recognized by IUCN